Young Dan'l Boone is an American adventure drama series that was broadcast on CBS for four episodes from September 12 to October 4, 1977. The series follows famed American frontiersman Daniel Boone on his adventures before his marriage. His three companions are Peter Dawes, a 12-year-old English boy, a runaway slave named Hawk, and a Cherokee named Tsiskwa. Meanwhile, Rebecca Bryan waits at home hoping she and Daniel will marry someday.

The 1960s Daniel Boone series starring Fess Parker had been a commercial success, but was often mocked for its historical inaccuracies. The makers of Young Dan'l Boone sought to be more realistic. The series was shot on location in the Appalachian Mountains near where the real Daniel Boone grew up. The plots were based more on actual events, but the show had poor ratings and was soon cancelled.

Cast 
Daniel Boone - Rick Moses
Rebecca Bryan - Devon Ericson
Hawk - Ji-Tu Cumbuka
Peter Dawes - John Joseph Thomas
Tsiskwa - Eloy Casados

Episodes

Guest stars
Guest stars included Cal Bellini (as Red Eagle), Jeremy Brett (as Langford), Kurt Kasznar (as Emil Van Diben), Clive Revill (as Teague), Len Birman (as Duval), Paul Shenar (as Hammond) and Richard Kiel (as Grimm). Several actors from the nearby University of Tennessee theater department played recurring Native Americans.

Explanatory notes

References

External links

CBS original programming
1977 American television series debuts
1977 American television series endings
Television series by 20th Century Fox Television
Cultural depictions of Daniel Boone
Television series set in the 18th century
Television series about the history of the United States
Television shows set in Kentucky
1970s Western (genre) television series